Carlos Manuel Gonçalves Alonso, better known as Kali (born 11 October 1978 in Luanda) is an Angolan former professional footballer who played as a defender.

International career
He is a former member of the national team, and was called up to the 2006 World Cup. He was named in the Angolan squad for the 2008 African Cup of Nations in Ghana as a player on the starting 11.

International statistics

References

External links
 

1978 births
Living people
Footballers from Luanda
Association football defenders
Angolan footballers
Angola international footballers
Angolan expatriate footballers
AC Arlésien players
C.D. Primeiro de Agosto players
C.D. Santa Clara players
C.D. Montijo players
FC Sion players
Ligue 2 players
Primeira Liga players
2006 FIFA World Cup players
2006 Africa Cup of Nations players
2008 Africa Cup of Nations players
2010 Africa Cup of Nations players
2012 Africa Cup of Nations players
2011 African Nations Championship players
Expatriate footballers in Switzerland
Expatriate footballers in France
Angolan expatriate sportspeople in France
Angolan expatriate sportspeople in Switzerland
Angola A' international footballers